The Southern Hills Hospital & Medical Center is a private, for-profit hospital owned by the Hospital Corporation of America and operated by the Sunrise Healthcare System. The 265-bed hospital is located in Spring Valley, Nevada. It is an accredited Chest Pain Center and Primary Stroke Center, and was named the Best Hospital in Las Vegas in 2015, 2016, 2017, and 2019.

History
The $140 million hospital opened in 2004. When it was constructed, two extra floors were built and left vacant to speed the construction of future expansions, while reducing the impact of new construction on existing operations.

Services
The Southern Hills Hospital & Medical Center offers a comprehensive range of health care services, including:

 Behavioral Health Services
 Breast Care Services
 Cardiovascular Services
 Diagnostic Imaging
 Emergency Care
 Critical Care Services
 Maternity
 Women's Services
 Family Health
 Joint Replacement & Orthopedics
 Neurological Services
 Surgical Services
 Robotic Surgery

Accreditation
 Joint Commission accredited
 American College of Radiology (ACR) accredited in MRI, computed tomography, ultrasound and nuclear medicine

References

External links
 

2004 establishments in Nevada
Hospital buildings completed in 2004
HCA Healthcare
Hospitals established in 2004
Hospitals in the Las Vegas Valley